San Salvatore al Vescovo is a church located in Florence, Italy.

It was first built in the 11th century and has had several subsequent modifications.  The lower portion of the facade is built in a Romanesque architecture style with bi-colored marble decorations.

References

Salvatore al Vescovo
11th-century Roman Catholic church buildings in Italy